McMurtrey Creek is a stream in northwest Reynolds County in the U.S. state of Missouri. It is a tributary of the West Fork Black River.

A variant spelling was "McMurty Creek". The creek has the name of the local McMurty family.

See also
List of rivers of Missouri

References

Rivers of Reynolds County, Missouri
Rivers of Missouri